The Edmonton Chimos were a professional women's ice hockey team in the Western Women's Hockey League (WWHL). The team played its home games at River Cree Twin Arenas  in Edmonton,  Canada. The Owner was Arlan Maschmayer.

History 

The Chimos were founded in 1973  following ads looking for women in the Edmonton area who wanted to play hockey.  By the 1980s, they had become the dominant women's team in Alberta, capturing every Alberta provincial championship, except for one, from 1982-1997.  Representing Alberta at the Esso Canadian national championships 16 times in their history, the Chimos have captured the National title four times: 1984, 1985, 1992 and 1997.
In 2001, the Chimos were approached to join the National Women's Hockey League, along with their provincial rival, the Calgary Oval X-Treme.  They joined the league in 2002 with the Calgary Oval X-Treme and the Vancouver Griffins to form the NWHL's Western Division.  The Griffins folded after only one season, leaving just the two Alberta teams.  Consistently overmatched by their Calgary rivals, and lacking true competition in the NWHL as the West division did not fly east, the Alberta clubs broke away from the NWHL to help form the five team Western Women's Hockey League in 2004 before the two leagues were once again united under the NWHL banner in 2006. However, this was short lived as the NWHL and WWHL could not reach an agreement upon a playoff schedule. As a result, the merger was not consummated. With the collapse of the NWHL in the summer of 2007, the Western Women's Hockey League was once again a completely independent league. The goal of the new league is to promote women’s hockey in the west.

For 2011-12 season, The Edmonton Chimos and Strathmore Rockies combined to form Team Alberta the Canadian Women's Hockey League (CWHL). The new team played in different locations in Alberta. The team became based out of both Calgary and Edmonton to accommodate all of western Canada's elite female players. Team Alberta would later become the Calgary Inferno.

Season-by-season 

Note: GP = Games played, W = Wins, L = Losses, T = Ties, GF = Goals for, GA = Goals against, Pts = Points.

Season standings

Roster
   and

Coaching staff 

 Head Coach: Jason Schmidt
 Assistant Coach: Chip Sawchuk
 Assistant Coach: Matt Appelt
 Trainer: Pat Toner

Awards and honors
 Colette Prefontaine, Best Goaltender, 1998 Esso National championships

Scoring leaders
These are the top-ten point, goal, and assist scorers in franchise history. Figures are updated after each completed WWHL regular season.

Note: Pos = Position; GP = Games played; G = Goals; A = Assists; Pts = Points; P/G = Points per game; G/G = Goals per game; A/G = Assists per game; * = current Chimos player

Note: Statistics kept since 2004.

See also
Western Women's Hockey League (WWHL)
List of ice hockey teams in Alberta

References

External links
 Edmonton Chimos Facebook page

Defunct ice hockey teams in Canada
Chimos, Edmonton
Ice hockey clubs established in 1973
Sports clubs disestablished in 2011
Women's ice hockey teams in Canada
Western Women's Hockey League teams
1973 establishments in Alberta
2011 disestablishments in Alberta
Women in Alberta